Callisburg is a city in Cooke County, in the U.S. state of Texas. The population was 353 at the 2010 census.

History
The town was named for blacksmith Sam Callis, the first settler there.

Geography

Callisburg is located in northeastern Cooke County at  (33.700207, –97.013912).

Demographics

As of the census of 2000, there were 365 people, 129 households, and 105 families residing in the city. The population density was 155.6 people per square mile (60.0/km2). There were 137 housing units at an average density of 58.4 per square mile (22.5/km2). The racial makeup of the city was 95.07% White, 1.92% Native American, 1.92% from other races, and 1.10% from two or more races. Hispanic or Latino of any race were 3.56% of the population.

There were 129 households, out of which 44.2% had children under the age of 18 living with them, 71.3% were married couples living together, 6.2% had a female householder with no husband present, and 18.6% were non-families. 17.1% of all households were made up of individuals, and 7.8% had someone living alone who was 65 years of age or older. The average household size was 2.83 and the average family size was 3.17.

In the city, the population was spread out, with 32.3% under the age of 18, 7.7% from 18 to 24, 28.8% from 25 to 44, 19.2% from 45 to 64, and 12.1% who were 65 years of age or older. The median age was 33 years. For every 100 females, there were 109.8 males. For every 100 females age 18 and over, there were 112.9 males.

The median income for a household in the city was $34,500, and the median income for a family was $40,893. Males had a median income of $29,231 versus $20,417 for females. The per capita income for the city was $15,228. About 13.1% of families and 11.1% of the population were below the poverty line, including 11.2% of those under age 18 and none of those age 65 or over.

References

External links
City of Callisburg official website

Cities in Texas
Cities in Cooke County, Texas